Arón Canet Barbero (born 30 September 1999) is a Spanish motorcycle racer, currently competing in the Moto2 for Pons Racing.

Career

Early career
Canet was the third-place finisher in the 2015 FIM CEV Moto3 Junior World Championship.

Moto3 World Championship

Estrella Galicia 0,0 (2016–2018)
In , Canet made his Grand Prix debut in the Moto3 World Championship with the Estrella Galicia 0,0 team riding a Honda.

Sterilgarda Max Racing Team (2019)

Moto2 World Championship

2020-present
In 2020 season, he graduated for Inde Aspar Team in the Moto2 World Championship.

After that, in 2022 season he joined with the Flexbox HP40.

Career statistics

FIM CEV Moto3 Junior World Championship

Races by year
(key) (Races in bold indicate pole position; races in italics indicate fastest lap)

Grand Prix motorcycle racing

By season

By class

Races by year
(key) (Races in bold indicate pole position; races in italics indicate fastest lap)

 Half points awarded as less than two thirds of the race distance (but at least three full laps) was completed.

External links

Spanish motorcycle racers
Moto3 World Championship riders
People from Ribera Baixa
Sportspeople from the Province of Valencia
1999 births
Living people
Moto2 World Championship riders